Faioli is a Brazilian surname. Notable people with the surname include:

Alexandre Faioli (born 1983), Brazilian footballer
Mancini (Brazilian footballer) (born 1980), Brazilian footballer and manager

Surnames of South American origin